The 6th Road to Le Mans Cup is an automobile endurance event that took place on 19 and 21 August 2021, at the Circuit de la Sarthe, Le Mans, France. The race features LMP3 and GT3 category cars competing in their respective classes.

Entry list

Qualifying
Provisional pole positions in each class are denoted in bold.

Race 1

Race 2

Races

Race 1

Race 2

References

External links
 

Le Mans
Le Mans